was a Japanese politician who was Prime Minister of Japan from 1980 to 1982. He was the last prime minister to have been born in the Meiji era.

Early life and education
Suzuki was born on 11 January 1911, Yamada, Iwate Prefecture, the eldest son of a fishery owner. He graduated from Tokyo University of Fisheries in 1935.

Career

Suzuki joined the Liberal Party in 1948, and helped merge it with another right of center party to establish the Liberal Democratic Party (LDP) in 1955. He was Minister of Health from 1965 to 1966, and Minister of Agriculture & Fisheries from 1976 to 1977.

Suzuki was appointed Prime Minister following the sudden death of Masayoshi Ōhira, who died of a heart attack during a general election campaign. The sympathy vote generated by Ohira's death resulted in a landslide for the ruling LDP, handing Suzuki the largest parliamentary majority any Prime Minister had enjoyed for many years.  He chose not to run for reelection to the presidency of the LDP in 1982, and was succeeded by Yasuhiro Nakasone.

He served during a period of instability; cabinet members frequently changed, and parties were often split by fractional politics. His diplomatic skills allowed him to chair his party's executive council ten times, winning him support in his early career.  Despite his foreign policy gaffes as prime minister, he later helped further foreign relations with the United States, during a 1988 summit with Ronald Reagan.

Personal life and death
Suzuki's daughter, Chikako Aso, is the wife of Taro Aso, who served as the Prime Minister of Japan from 2008 to 2009. His son Shun'ichi Suzuki serves in the Diet.

Suzuki died at the International Medical Center of Japan in Tokyo of pneumonia on 19 July 2004 at the age of 93. His wife died in 2015.

Honours
From the corresponding article in the Japanese Wikipedia

 Grand Cordon of the Order of the Chrysanthemum (July 2004; posthumous)

References

|-

|-

|-

|-

|-

|-

|-

|-

Prime Ministers of Japan
1911 births
2004 deaths
20th-century prime ministers of Japan
Liberal Party (Japan, 1945) politicians
Democratic Liberal Party (Japan) politicians
Liberal Democratic Party (Japan) politicians
20th-century Japanese politicians
Politicians from Iwate Prefecture